Above the Treeline is a United States company behind the Edelweiss+ platform, which provides many services that support the book industry.

Edelweiss+ 
Publishers use Edelweiss+ to share digital catalogs and title information, communicate with bookstores and other book professionals, market their titles, analyze their sales, and share review copies to generate reviews and sales. Bookstores use Edelweiss+ to learn about new titles, communicate with sales reps, place orders, and manage their inventory. Libraries use Edelweiss+ to learn about new titles, communicate with publishers, and manage their collection. Other book professionals, such as reviewers, publicists, agencies, and the media also use Edelweiss+ to learn about new titles. Basic user accounts are free. The platform is used by over 120,000 book professionals. 

The website hosts digital catalogs from all major US publishers (presence is growing internationally) and includes 95% of the US frontlist titles. Users may search by publisher and catalog or across all publishers.  Judith Rosen of Publishers Weekly noted that the adoption of Edelweiss+ and rise of digital catalogs has changed the way the book industry works.

Edelweiss+Analytics is an add-on module available to publishers, bookstores, and libraries that provides additional functionality and decision intelligence for users.

External links
 
 Edelweiss platform

References

Online retailers of the United States
Book selling websites